The Kingdom of Gulmi was a petty kingdom in the confederation of 24 states known as Chaubisi Rajya. Gulmi was part of the Kingdom of Palpa but it became independent, and it later became part of Nepal in 1806.

List of Kings

References 

Chaubisi Rajya
Gulmi
Gulmi
History of Nepal
Gulmi
19th-century disestablishments in Nepal

References 
Ramaniya Pavitra Resunga in Nepali language (Wonderful Mountain Resunga) 2020 author Krishna Bahadur Kunwar (in Gulmi rajya, there are lots of information)